Beddgelert railway station is a railway station on the narrow gauge Welsh Highland Railway in North Wales.

The rebuilt station was officially opened by Lord Elis-Thomas on 7 April 2009.

History
The original station, which served the original Welsh Highland Railway line from  - Portmadoc, was in operation, with a passing loop and three sidings, from 1922 to 1936.

Construction

Work to rebuild the station began in December 2006. The new station has a large curved island platform, allowing for two trains to pass each other. There are two small shelters for passenger use.

A large water tower has been installed at the north west end of the platform. An original locomotive siding on the west side of the station has been retained and lengthened. The original water tower from Old WHR days, on the Down side of the station, has been restored and is occasionally used for small locomotives.

The main station building, which will not be on the platform, is to be located north east of the platform.  Construction commenced in 2007 with the laying of the base. Completion has been delayed, due to financial reasons and in the meantime a temporary booking office is in front of the foundations.

Opposition
Plans to reopen the station in Beddgelert created local opposition over a number of matters: it was to be far too big; it would intrude on the landscape; it would increase traffic in the village and make parking difficult.

It had been agreed with the Snowdonia National Park Authority (SNPA) that the station would not open until the railway was completed to the south side of the National Park.
Restrictions were placed upon the company by the National Park Authority, but on 23 July 2008, the SNPA was compelled, on appeal, to revoke a planning condition which would have limited sales at the station to tickets and railway souvenirs only.

There are two solid shelters on the station, given by benefactors; there are portaloos, and a GST office for the stationmistress.

Operations

Between 7 April 2009 and 21 May 2009, all trains terminated at Beddgelert.

Notes

References

External links
The Welsh Highland Railway Project - official reconstruction site
Rebuilding The Welsh Highland Railway - an independent site updated almost daily
Station Building Controversy

Heritage railway stations in Gwynedd
Welsh Highland Railway
Beddgelert